is a Japanese bobsledder who has competed since 2009. She finished 16th in the 2010 Winter Olympics in Vancouver, British Columbia, Canada.

Azasu's best World Cup finish was 18th twice both in early 2010.

References
 
 

1986 births
Bobsledders at the 2010 Winter Olympics
Japanese female bobsledders
Living people
Olympic bobsledders of Japan
Sportspeople from Shimane Prefecture
21st-century Japanese women